Car Crash (also known as Carrera salvaje) is a 1981 Italian-Spanish-Mexican action film directed by Antonio Margheriti and starring Joey Travolta, Vittorio Mezzogiorno and Ana Obregón.

Plot
Paul the race car driver and nick the mechanic win a fixed race and running afoul of local mafia leader Eli Wrosnky who tells them not to attend the Big Illegal race in Mexico called the imperial crash. so  naturally Paul and Nick decide to visit their friend Paguito who has been working on a Pontiac firebird that was designed specifically for the imperial crash. Paguito is then shot dead. and so Paul and nick and Paul's ex-girlfriend Janice travel to Mexico city.  the race begins. the mafia's  hired driver Al Costa causes a crash that  results in almost the whole field crashing and dying. heading into the final lap the only drivers who are still alive are Paul and Al Costa. Paul Runs Al's car off the road  of the second to last turn. Paul wins on account of him being the only guy who is still alive and he, Nick, and Janice celebrate

Cast 

Joey Travolta as Paul  
Vittorio Mezzogiorno as  Nick 
Ana Obregón as   Janice 
John Steiner as  Kirby 
Ricardo Palacios as  Eli Wronsky
Sal Borgese as  Al Costa

See also
 List of Italian films of 1981

References

External links
  

1981 action films
1981 films
Italian action films
Italian auto racing films
Mexican action films
Spanish action films
English-language Italian films
English-language Mexican films
English-language Spanish films
1980s English-language films
1980s Italian-language films
1980s Spanish-language films
Films directed by Antonio Margheriti
1980s Italian films
1980s Mexican films